The Basque Country women's football team (officially, in Basque, Euskal Herriko emakumezkoen futbol selekzioa) is considered the national team of the Basque Country greater region. It is organised by the Basque Football Federation (Euskadiko Futbol Federakundea). It is not affiliated with FIFA or UEFA and therefore it is only allowed to play friendly matches.

Results and fixtures

Legend

Coaching staff

Current coaching staff

Manager history

Players

Current squad
The following players were called up for the Friendly match against Chile on 20 December 2022.
Caps and goals as of 21 December 2022

|-----
! colspan="9" bgcolor="#FFDEAD" align="left" | Goalkeeper
|----- bgcolor="#FFECCE"

|-----
! colspan="9" bgcolor="#B0D3FB" align="left" | Defender
|----- bgcolor="#E7FAEC"

|-----
! colspan="9" bgcolor="#BBF0C9" align="left" | Midfielder
|----- bgcolor="#DFEDFD"

|-----
! colspan="9" bgcolor="#FFACB3" align="left" | Forward
|----- bgcolor="#FFD2D6"

Recent call-ups
The following players have played for a team in the last calls.

Notable players
Basque players who represented FIFA international teams.

See also
Football in the Basque Country
Basque Country men's national football team

References

External links
EFF official website
soccerway profile

Spanish autonomous women's football teams
Basque Country
Basque Country national football team
Football women